Aeronut Park Balloonport  is a public-use balloon airport located four nautical miles (7 km) east of the central business district of Howell, a city in Livingston County, Michigan, United States. It is privately owned by James H. Pratt.
Note:  As of Aug 2020, the balloon port has been sold and is abandoned. JP.

Facilities and aircraft 
Aeronut Park Balloonport has one runway designated B1 with a 900 x 250 ft (274 x 76 m) turf surface.

For the 12-month period ending December 31, 2015, the aircraft has 10 operations per year, all general aviation. For the same time period, 1 aircraft is based on the field, a single-engine airplane.

References

External links 

WorldAeroData airport information

Airports in Michigan
Ballooning
Buildings and structures in Livingston County, Michigan
Transportation in Livingston County, Michigan